is a dam in Omi, Nagano Prefecture, Japan, completed in 1999.

References 

Dams in Nagano Prefecture
Dams completed in 1999
1999 establishments in Japan